This is a list of known American football players who have played for the Kenosha Maroons of the National Football League in 1924. It includes players that have played at least one match with the team.



A
Dunc Annan

B
Don Batchelor,
Al Burgin

C
Marty Conrad

E
Howard Edwards

F
Guil Falcon,
Frank FitzGerald

G
Joe Gillis,
Casimir Gozdowski

H
Cowboy Hill,
Tommy Holleran,
Steamer Horning,
Ben Hunt

J
Cliff Jetmore,
Jerry Jones,
Reno Jones

K
John Kellison,
Clancy Kelly,
Jim Kendrick,
Gus King,
Heinie Kirkgard

L
Dutch Lauer

M
Tom Mcnamara,
Cy Myers

O
Chuck O'Neil

P
Dwight Peabody,
Elmer Petrie,
Bob Phelan

R
Jim Roberts, 
Tubby Roush

S
Buck Saunders,
Jimmy Simpson,
Herb Stein,
Russ Stein,
Frank Seyfrit,
Dutch Strauss

T
John Tanner,
Festus Tierney

V
Tillie Voss

W
Rat Watson,
Wilbur White

References
1922 Toledo Maroons Roster
1923 Toledo Maroons Roster

 
Tol